Olivet may refer to:

Places

France
 Olivet, Loiret, in the Loiret département
 Olivet, Mayenne, in the Mayenne département

Middle East
 The Mount of Olives, on the east side of Jerusalem

United States
 Olivet, Illinois
 Olivet, Kansas
 Olivet, Michigan
 Olivet, New Jersey
 Olivet, South Dakota
 Olivet, Tennessee
 Olivet, Giles County, Tennessee
 Olivet, Wisconsin
 Mount Olivet, Kentucky

People
 Pierre-Joseph Thoulier d'Olivet (1682-1768), French abbot, writer, grammarian and translator

Arts, entertainment, and media
 Dr. Elizabeth Olivet, a fictional character in the Law & Order television franchise
 The Olivet Discourse or Olivet prophecy or Little Apocalypse,  a New Testament biblical passage found in the Synoptic Gospels

Education
 Olivet College in Olivet, Michigan
 Olivet Nazarene University in Bourbonnais, Illinois; named for Olivet, Illinois
 Olivet University, headquartered in San Francisco, California

Other uses
Olivet, one of two tram cars on the Angels Flight funicular in Los Angeles, California